Rajkot East is one of the 182 Legislative Assembly constituencies of Gujarat state in India. It is part of Rajkot district.

List of segments
This assembly seat represents the following wards of Rajkot Municipal Corporation:

Rajkot Taluka (Part) – Rajkot Municipal Corporation (Part) Ward No. – 5, 16, 17, 18, 19, 20.

Members of Legislative Assembly

Election results

2022

2017

2012

See also
 List of constituencies of the Gujarat Legislative Assembly
 Rajkot district

References

External links
 

Assembly constituencies of Gujarat
Rajkot district